Alan Martha (born July 22, 1992) is an Indonesian former footballer who played as a forward. He scored 2 goals for Indonesia U-19 against Chinese Taipei U-19 in a 2010 AFC U-19 Championship qualification match.

International goals

Honours

Club

Sriwijaya U-21
 Indonesia Super League U-21: 2012–13

References

External links
 Alan Martha Liga Indonesia
 Alan Martha Soccerway

1992 births
Living people
People from Padang
Indonesian footballers
Deportivo Indonesia players
Persija Jakarta players
Association football forwards
Minangkabau people
Sportspeople from West Sumatra